Houston Stewart Island is one of the Canadian arctic islands in Nunavut, Canada. Located in the Queens Channel, it is surrounded by larger islands: Devon Island to the north; Dundas Island and Margaret Island to the northeast; Baillie-Hamilton Island to the east; Cornwallis Island to the south; Little Cornwallis Island to the southwest; Crozier Island to the west; and Baring Island to the northwest.

References

External links
 Houston Stewart Island in the Atlas of Canada - Toporama; Natural Resources Canada

Islands of the Queen Elizabeth Islands
Uninhabited islands of Qikiqtaaluk Region